Her First Experience is a 1939 German romance film directed by Josef von Báky and starring Ilse Werner, Johannes Riemann and Charlott Daudert.

The film's sets were designed by the art director Willy Schiller. Location filming took place in Berlin and Schleswig-Holstein.

Plot
An art student falls madly in love with her Professor, threatening his marriage.

Cast

References

External links

1930s romance films
German romance films
Films of Nazi Germany
Films directed by Josef von Báky
Films based on German novels
Films set in universities and colleges
Films about fictional painters
UFA GmbH films
German black-and-white films
1930s German films